Beli Beli Bay is a bay on the eastern coast of Goodenough Island. It was utilised during World War II as an anchorage.

Notes

References
 

Bays of Papua New Guinea